Brian West (born March 12, 1971) is a Canadian record producer, songwriter, musician, engineer and mixer. He is a guitarist for the Canadian band The Philosopher Kings. Formerly of the production team Track and Field, he is best known for his work with Nelly Furtado, Maroon 5, Awolnation, K'naan, and Bono. He co-produced Andy Grammer's single Honey, I'm Good with Steve Greenberg and Nolan Sipe. His most recent release, "Salted Wound," sung by Sia, is on the Fifty Shades of Grey soundtrack. West has been nominated for an Academy Award, two Grammy Awards and has won seven Juno Awards.

Life and career
West began his career as the lead guitarist for Toronto-based band The Philosopher Kings in 1994. After achieving some commercial success in the late 1990s and winning a Canadian Juno Award with the group, he began to produce music for other artists, partnering up with Kings lead singer Gerald Eaton to produce Nelly Furtado's debut album, Whoa, Nelly! The project garnered a Grammy nomination for West's production and a win for Furtado, as well as several Juno Awards. Working as a production duo under the name Track and Field, together West and Eaton co-wrote and co-produced Furtado's follow-up album Folklore and two albums with Somali Canadian rapper K'Naan, landing themselves several more Junos. Before long, West branched off into solo production, now producing and writing alongside such notable artists as Maroon 5, Awolnation, K'Naan, Nakia, and Bono.

His work has been featured on soundtracks for a number of films, including Fifty Shades of Grey, The Mortal Instruments: City of Bones, 20 Feet from Stardom, The Italian Job, Harold and Kumar Escape from Guantanamo Bay, and Brokedown Palace, among others.

Selected discography

Awards and nominations
Grammy Awards
2013 – Best Pop Vocal Album (Maroon 5, Overexposed): Nominated
2002 – Producer of the Year, Non-Classical: Nominated

Latin Grammy Awards
2010 – Best Female Pop Vocal Album (Nelly Furtado, Mi Plan): Won

Juno Awards
2010 – Artist of the Year (K'Naan): Won
2006 – Rap Recording of the Year (K'Naan, The Dusty Foot Philosopher): Won
2004 – Single of the Year (Nelly Furtado, "Powerless (Say What You Want)"): Won
2001 – Best Producer: Won
2001 – Best Single (Nelly Furtado, "I'm Like a Bird"): Won
2001 – Best New Solo Artist (Nelly Furtado): Won
1996 – Best New Group (The Philosopher Kings): Won

SOCAN Awards
2010 – SOCAN Award for No. 1 song (K'Naan, "Take a Minute"): Won

References

External links
Brian West discography on Discogs.com
Sweetwesty.com: Brian West official website

1971 births
Living people
Canadian record producers
Canadian rhythm and blues musicians
Jack Richardson Producer of the Year Award winners
Musicians from Ontario
People from Sarnia
Sony Music Publishing artists
21st-century Canadian guitarists